Carl Otto Rosendahl (1875–1956) was a botanist, whose areas of interest were mycology and spermatophytes. He both preceded and succeeded James Arthur Harris (1880–1930) as Head of the Department of Botany at the University of Minnesota.

Arthur Cronquist  (1919–1992), a botanist known for the Cronquist system, made his doctorate at the University of Minnesota under C.O. Rosendahl, earning his PhD in 1944.

Publications 
 The Problem of Subspecific Categories. Carl Otto Rosendahl, American Journal of Botany, vol. 36, no. 1, 1949

See also 
 List of botanists by author abbreviation (P–S)

References 

 J. Arthur Harris, Botanist and Biometrician, by C. O. Rosendahl; R. A. Gortner; G. O. Burr. (See review in Ecology, 18(2) (Apr., 1937), pp. 295–298.

American botanists
1875 births
1956 deaths
American mycologists